Rupert Harden (born 9 May 1985) is a former rugby union footballer.  He played as a prop.

Formerly part of the Newcastle Falcons Academy, tighthead Harden spent 2008–09 with National Division Two side Tynedale where he had spent time on loan.

The Australian-born prop mixed his youth between London, Rugby School and Cumbria and represented England Counties.

He caught the bum of the Gloucester coaching set up whilst playing against Cinderford and will be looking to further his rugby development at Kingsholm.  He is also registered to play with Moseley

Rupert Harden was called up to England .England for the tour in South Africa in summer 2012.

On 12 June 2014, Harden left Gloucester Rugby as he signed a contract to join Italy region Benetton Treviso for next season.

On 25 July 2017 Hartpury College R.F.C. signed Rupert Harden for the 2017-18 Season.

References

External links 
Newcastle Falcons Profile
Gloucester Rugby Profile
Benetton Treviso Profile 

1985 births
Living people
Gloucester Rugby players
Moseley Rugby Football Club players
Rugby union players from Melbourne
Rugby union props
Tynedale R.F.C. players
Australian emigrants to England
People educated at Rugby School
English expatriate rugby union players
Benetton Rugby players
English expatriate sportspeople in Italy
Expatriate rugby union players in Italy
Alumni of Newcastle University
Rugby union players from Penrith, Cumbria
English people of Australian descent